Marco Genaro Di Cesare (born 30 January 2002) is an Argentine professional footballer who plays as a centre-back or central midfielder for Argentinos Juniors.

Career
Di Cesare joined Argentinos Juniors in 2018 from Andes Talleres. He made the breakthrough into their first-team squad under manager Diego Dabove in 2020, as he signed his first professional contract in August; penning terms until December 2024. Di Cesare's senior debut arrived on 22 November in a Copa de la Liga Profesional defeat away to San Lorenzo, with the player replacing Matías Caruzzo with twelve minutes remaining.

Personal life
Di Cesare holds an Italian passport.

Career statistics
.

Notes

References

External links

2002 births
Living people
Sportspeople from Mendoza, Argentina
Argentine footballers
Argentine people of Italian descent
Association football defenders
Association football midfielders
Argentine Primera División players
Argentinos Juniors footballers